Antoniani is a surname.  Notable people with this name include the following:

Pietro Antoniani (c. 1740 - 1805), Italian painter
Silvio Antoniani, also referred to as Silvio Antoniano, (1540 - 1603), Italian Roman Catholic cardinal

See also

Antoniadi (disambiguation)
Antoniano (disambiguation)
Antonini (name)
Antonioni (surname)

Patronymic surnames
Surnames from given names